Zedner v. United States, 547 U.S. 489 (2006), was a United States Supreme Court case involving the right to a speedy trial.  Justice Samuel Alito, writing for a unanimous Court, ruled that a defendant cannot prospectively waive the protections of the Speedy Trial Act.  Justice Antonin Scalia filed a partial concurrence, objecting to Alito's use of legislative history.

Background 
Jacob Zedner was arrested in 1996 for attempting to open bank accounts with a fake $10 Million bond issued by the fictitious “Ministry of Finance of U.S.A.”  He was indicted by a grand jury in the Eastern District of New York for trying to pass counterfeit Treasury securities on April 4, 1996.  The District Court granted a continuance until September 6, then granted another continuance until November 8.  Due to difficulties in arranging a trial schedule, the judge suggested that the defendant waive his rights under the Speedy Trial Act "for all time."  The defendant and his attorney agreed to do so.

The case continued to languish for the next four years, during which time the defendant changed lawyers, was examined by a psychiatrist, and ultimately decided to proceed pro se.  On March 7, 2001, while his competency to stand trial was being examined, the defendant moved to have the case dismissed for failure to comply with the Speedy Trial Act.  The District Court denied his motion, and on April 7, 2003, the trial finally began.

Procedural history 
On April 7, 2003, after a trial in the District Court, a jury found Zedner guilty and the judge sentenced him to 63 months imprisonment.  The United States Court of Appeals for the Second Circuit upheld the verdict, including the waiver of speedy trial rights, and noted that any error was harmless.  The Supreme Court granted certiorari to determine if the waiver was effective.

Issue 
The Speedy Trial Act requires that a trial begin within seventy days of the indictment, but provides for a variety of exceptions.  If the trial does not begin on time, the defendant may move for dismissal, which the court must (under most circumstances) grant.

Parties' arguments 
The government contended that the defendant could waive his rights under the Act.  The defendant did so, but then contended that such a waiver was unlawful.  The issue had not been addressed in earlier cases.

Opinion of the Court 
The Court unanimously held that the defendant was correct; one may not prospectively waive one's rights under the Speedy Trial Act.  Justice Alito wrote that the purpose of the Act is not simply to protect the defendant's rights, but to protect the public's interest in a speedy trial.  For that reason, the Act excludes certain delays even at the request of the defendant.

Alito next discussed the legislative history of the Act; this is the section in which Justice Scalia declined to concur.  The history follows the explicit terms of the Act, stating that the public has an interest in quick resolutions to criminal charges.  Alito went on to discuss the lack of a provision for prospective waiver in the statute.

The Court then rejected the government's alternate theory of the case: that the defendant, having agreed to the waiver, is now estopped from challenging it.  The Court declines to apply estoppel doctrines, stating that it would "entirely swallow the Act's no-waiver policy."  Furthermore, the Court found, since the district court requested the waiver, rather than the defendant, estoppel is not applicable.  In addition, the harmless error doctrine does not apply to speedy trial violations.

Concurrence 
Justice Scalia concurred in everything except Part III-A-2, the section on legislative history.

References

External links
 
 Davis, Elliott M. (Summer 2007). The Newer Textualism: Justice Alito's Statutory Interpretation. Harvard Journal of Law & Public Policy

United States Supreme Court cases
United States Supreme Court cases of the Roberts Court
Speedy Trial Clause case law
2006 in United States case law
21st-century American trials